The Sinduria are a Hindu caste found in North India. They are also known as Kaithal or kayastha

References 

Social groups of Uttar Pradesh
Indian castes
Social groups of Bihar